Now It's Overhead was an indie rock band fronted by singer/songwriter Andy LeMaster and based in Athens, Georgia. Their first album, a self-titled collection of songs LeMaster wrote over a period of two years in the late 1990s, quickly rose from a studio project to a full-time band with the assistance of drummer Clay Leverett, Orenda Fink and Maria Taylor of Azure Ray. They were the first band not hailing from Nebraska to be signed by Omaha-based Saddle Creek Records.

In 2004 they released their sophomore, critically acclaimed album Fall Back Open, which included a duet with Michael Stipe of R.E.M., a long-time supporter of the band. That year, the band also embarked on a US tour as support for R.E.M, who are also from Athens, Georgia.

Now It's Overhead's third album Dark Light Daybreak was released on September 12, 2006. In 2007, they supported Scottish indie-rock band Idlewild on their tour of Great Britain.

Discography

Albums
Now It's Overhead (2001) – Saddle Creek Records
Fall Back Open (2004) – Saddle Creek Records
Dark Light Daybreak (2006) – Saddle Creek Records

Singles & EPs
Wait in a Line (2004) – Saddle Creek Records

Compilations
Saddle Creek 50 (2002) – Saddle Creek Records
Lagniappe: A Saddle Creek Benefit for Hurricane Katrina (2005) – Saddle Creek Records

External links
Now It's Overhead official website
Saddle Creek Records
Now It's Overhead on ArtistDirect
Lazy-i Interview: March 2004
Soundcrank Podcast Hosted by Now It's Overhead

Indie rock musical groups from Georgia (U.S. state)
Musical groups from Athens, Georgia
Saddle Creek Records artists